Arkadi Georgiyevich Tyapkin (1895–1942) was an association football player.

International career
Tyapkin played his only game for Russia on July 12, 1914, in a friendly against Norway.

External links 
 
  Profile

1895 births
1942 deaths
Russian footballers
Russia international footballers
Association football defenders